Prison Leopards Football Club is a Zambian football club based in Kabwe, Zambia.
The club plays its football in the Zambia Super League, the highest division in Zambian football. The club's kit manufacturer is Joma.

History
The club was founded in 1974.
The club is based in the city of Kabwe, they play their matches at Godfrey Chitalu Stadium. It has played the majority of its seasons in the National Division One, but the club has enjoyed most of its success recently, being promoted to the Zambia Super League for the 2020-21 season, finishing 6th, before finishing 16th the next season.

Current squad

Squad

Honours
Runners-up Zambia National Division One: 1
2019-20

Rivalries
The club shares a rivalry with Kabwe city neighbours Kabwe Warriors, even sharing the same stadium. However, Kabwe Warriors has had much more success in its history, winning 5 Zambian League titles.

References

External links

Football clubs in Zambia
Sport in Zambia
Association football clubs established in 1974